Shenyang, formerly known as Fengtian or by its Manchu name Mukden, is a major Chinese sub-provincial city and the provincial capital of Liaoning province. Located in north-central Liaoning, it is the province's most populous city, with a total population of 9,070,093 inhabitants as of the 2020 census. Among the resident population of the city, the male population is 4,521,021, accounting for 49.85%; the female population is 4,549,072, accounting for 50.15%. The sex ratio of the total population (with women as 100, the ratio of men to women) dropped from 102.10 in the sixth national census in 2010 to 99.38. Its built-up (or metro) area encompassing 8 Shenyang urban districts and the 4 Fushun urban districts, was home to 8,192,848 inhabitants in 2020. It is also the largest city in Northeast China by urban population, with 7.49 million people (2020 census).

Shenyang is also the central city of one of the major megalopolises in China, the Greater Shenyang Metropolitan Area, which has a total population over 23 million.  The city's administrative region includes the ten metropolitan districts of Shenyang proper, the county-level city of Xinmin, and two counties: Kangping and Faku.

Shenyang has passed through the control of many states and peoples in history. In the 14th century, Shenyang came under the control of the Ming dynasty. The city served as an important Chinese military stronghold during the Ming period. The Manchu people conquered Shenyang from the Ming in the 17th century and briefly used it as the capital of Qing dynasty China. In 1905, the Battle of Mukden took place south of Shenyang during the Russo-Japanese War. Japan's subsequent victory allowed Tokyo to annex the region west of the old city and to increase Japanese influence on Shenyang; in September 1931 the Mukden Incident led the Japanese to further invade and occupy the rest of Northeast China, forming the puppet state of Manchukuo.  After the Japanese surrender in 1945, Shenyang remained a Kuomintang stronghold, but the Communists captured it in 1948 after the Liaoshen Campaign.

Along with its nearby cities, Shenyang is an important industrial center in China, and serves as the transportation and commercial hub of China's northeast—particularly involved in links with Japan, Russia and Korea. A center of heavy industry in China since the 1930s, and the spearhead of the Chinese central government's Northeast Area Revitalization Plan, the city has been diversifying its industry, including expanding into the service sector. Growing industries include software, automotive and electronics.

Shenyang is also a major city for scientific research, appearing among the top 200 science cities in the world as tracked by the Nature Index.
The city is home to several major universities, notably Northeastern University and Liaoning University, members of China's prestigious universities in the Double First Class University Plan.

Name
Shenyang literally means "the yang side of the Shen River" and refers to the location of the Hun River (formerly called the Shen River), on the southern side of the city.  According to Chinese naming tradition, a river's north bank and a mountain's south slope are angled more towards direct sunlight and thus are considered the "sunny", or "yang", side.

History

Early history

Archaeological findings show that humans resided in present-day Shenyang as early as 8,000 years ago. The remains of the Xinle culture, a late neolithic period society over 6,800–7,200 years old, are located in a museum in the north part of Huanggu District.  It is complemented by a recreated village on site. A wood-sculptured bird unearthed there is the earliest cultural relic in Shenyang, as well as one of oldest wood sculptures found anywhere in the world.

The city now known as Shenyang was first established in about 300 BCE during the Warring States period by Yan general Qin Kai, who conquered the Liaodong region from Gojoseon. It was then named Hou City. Around 350 years later, during the reign of Emperor Guangwu of Han, the city was sacked and burnt by the Donghu nomads and subsequently abandoned. The area of modern Shenyang was divided between two commanderies called Liaodong and Xuantu around 107 CE. Liaodong was seized by a Han governor in 189. Liaodong and Xuantu were briefly united under the Wei Dynasty and Jin Dynasty. The region was in disarray during the fourth century until the Koguryo occupied both commanderies in 404. They established the cities of Xuantucheng and Gaimoucheng in the region. The Sui dynasty recaptured the area and established a new Liaodong Commandery in what is now modern Shenyang. In 645, the Tang dynasty invaded Koguryo and captured Xuantucheng and Gaimoucheng. Soon after, Liaodong was administratively reorganized and enjoyed nearly 250 years of stability and development.

In 916, the Shenyang region was captured by the Liao dynasty and was known as Shen Prefecture until the end of Jin dynasty (who conquered the region in 1116). The area became known as the Shenyang Circuit during the Yuan dynasty. After the fall of the Yuan, Shenyang came under the control of the Ming dynasty, and it was designated a "guard town" (militarized settlement) named Shenyang Central Guard. During the Ming Dynasty, Shenyang became one of the most important Chinese military strongholds beyond the Shanhai Pass.

Manchu period

In 1625, the Jurchen leader Nurhaci captured Shenyang from the Ming and decided to relocate his entire administrative infrastructures to the city, which was then called  hoton in the Manchu language. The official name was changed to Shengjing, or  Mukden, in 1634. Under Nurhaci's orders, the Imperial Palace was constructed in 1626, symbolizing the city's emerging status as the Jurchen political center. The palace featured more than 300 ostentatiously decorated rooms and 20 gardens as a symbol of power and grandeur.

After the fall of the Ming dynasty in 1644 and the routing of the Shun army in the Battle of Shanhai Pass just a day later, the Manchus successfully entered the Shanhai Pass to establish the Qing dynasty in China proper. The capital was subsequently relocated from Shenyang to Beijing. However, Shenyang retained considerable importance as the secondary capital and spiritual home of the Qing dynasty through the centuries. Treasures of the royal house were kept at its palaces, and the tombs of the early Qing rulers were once among the most famous monuments in China. In 1657, Fengtian Prefecture (or ) was established in the Shenyang area, and Fengtian was sometimes used synonymously with Shenyang/Mukden.

Russian and Japanese influence

After the First Sino-Japanese War of 1894-1895, Japan coerced the annexation of the Liaodong Peninsula with the Treaty of Shimonoseki in 1895, but had to give it up due to diplomatic pressure from the 1895 Triple Intervention.  In the aftermath of the Japanese threat, Qing viceroy Li Hongzhang visited Moscow in 1896 and signed a secret treaty with Russian foreign minister Aleksey Lobanov-Rostovsky, allowing the Russian Empire to build a Russian-gauge railway through Manchuria, which opened the door towards further Russian expansionism in the form of another lease convention in 1898, effectively allowing Russia to annex Port Arthur in all but name.  However, after the Boxer Rebellion in 1900, Russian forces used that anti-foreigner insurgency as a pretext to formally invade and occupy most of Manchuria, and Mukden became a Russian stronghold in the Far East with the building of what would become the South Manchurian Railway - from Harbin via Mukden to Dalny.

During the Russo-Japanese War (1904—1905), Mukden became the site of the Battle of Mukden from February 19 to March 10, 1905.  Involving more than 600,000 combat participants, it was the largest battle since the Battle of Leipzig in 1813, and also the largest modern-era battle ever fought in Asia before World War II.  Following this Japanese victory, Mukden became one of the chief bases of Japanese presence and economic expansion into southern Manchuria. It also became the government seat of Fengtian province in 1910. Mukden became one of the main epicenters of the Manchurian plague (1910—1911), which ultimately resulted in approximately 60,000 deaths.

Warlord Era and Japanese occupation

In 1914, the city changed back to its old name Shenyang, but continued to be known as Mukden (sometimes spelled Moukden) in some English sources and in Japan through much of the first half of 20th century. The postmark of the Chinese postal administration kept the spelling "MOUKDEN/" for usage on international mails until the late 1920s.  After that, a Chinese–Manchurian bilingual type "SHENYANG (MUKDEN)/" datestamp was used until 1933.

In the early 20th century, Shenyang began expanding out of its old city walls. The Shenyang Railway Station on the South Manchurian Railway and the Shenyang North Railway Station on the Jingfeng Railway, both west of the old city, became the new commercial centers of Shenyang.  In the 1920s, Mukden was the capital of the warlord Zhang Zuolin, who was later assassinated when his train was blown up on 4 June 1928 at a Japanese-guarded railway bridge.  At the time, several factories were built by Zhang to manufacture ammunition in the northern and eastern suburbs.  These factories laid the foundation for Shenyang's industrial development.

At around 10:20 pm on 18 September 1931, a small quantity of dynamite was detonated close to a railway line near Mukden owned by the Japanese South Manchuria Railway Company by Kwantung Army Lt. Kawamoto Suemori.  The Imperial Japanese Army, accusing Chinese dissidents of the act, then used the false flag explosion as pretext to launch a full attack on Mukden, and captured the city the following morning (September 19).  After the Mukden Incident, the Japanese further invaded and occupied the rest of Northeast China, and created the puppet state of Manchukuo with the deposed emperor Aisin Gioro Puyi as the figurehead.  During the Manchukuo era (1932–1945), the city was again called Fengtian (and Mukden in English), and was developed by the Japanese into a center of heavy industry. Japan was able to exploit resources in Manchuria using the extensive network of railroads. For example, vast expanses of Manchurian forest were chopped down. The development of Shenyang was also unbalanced in this period; municipal facilities were mostly located in Japanese residential areas, while Chinese residential areas had poor living conditions.

Post-World War II

Under Marshal of the Soviet Union Aleksandr Vasilevsky, the Far East Command of the Red Army occupied Manchuria in early August 1945 following the surrender of Japan. On 16 August 1945, Manchurian Emperor Puyi was captured in Shenyang Airport by the Soviets while he was in an airplane fleeing to Japan. On 20 August, Soviet troops captured Shenyang. British and US reports indicate that the Soviet troops that occupied Northeast China and Eastern Inner Mongolia region looted and terrorized the people of Shenyang, and were not discouraged by Soviet occupation authorities from "three days of rape and pillage".

The Soviets were replaced by the Republic of China Army, who were flown in on U.S. transport planes. During the Chinese Civil War, Shenyang remained a Kuomintang stronghold supplied by Claire Lee Chennault's Civil Air Transport from 1946 to 1948, although the Chinese Communist Party controlled the surrounding countryside. By February 1948 the city was suffering from drastic shortages, and by the summer 140,000 refugees per month were fleeing. It was captured by the People's Liberation Army on October 30, 1948, following a series of offensives led by Lin Biao known as the Liaoshen Campaign.

Over the past 200 years or so, Shenyang managed to grow and increase its industrial might during consecutive wars with Russia and Japan in the late 19th and early 20th centuries, the Second World War, and China's Civil War (Shenyang became the main battleground between the Communists and Nationalists).

21st century 
Directed by state efforts to reduce pollution and close unprofitable industry, the city has undergone deindustrialization, with the shutdown of large plants. Most notably, a large 1930s smelter in the central city was closed in 2000. The redevelopment of former polluted industrial land has resulted in gentrification.

Old City

The old city of Shenyang resided almost entirely within the modern day Shenhe District, and used to have two city walls.

Situated roughly within the area bounded by the four "Shuncheng" roads/streets in Shenhe District, the (now-demolished) square-shaped inner city wall marked the bounds of ancient Shenyang.  The earliest wall was built in 926 during early Liao dynasty to settle Northern Song civilians the Khitans abducted from raids to use as slave labourers, and was then made of rammed earth because the city was merely a small settlement at the time (historically the administrative center of the Liaodong region was at Liaoyang).  However, in 1368, Hongwu Emperor of the newly founded Ming dynasty ordered a new regional military command—the Liaodong Regional Military Commission—to be established, and Shenyang was made a prominent regional "guard town".  In 1388, Min Zhong, the newly appointed city commissioner of the Shenyang Central Guard, wrote to Hongwu Emperor immediately upon his tenure requesting permission to upgrade the city wall, and the old wall was made taller and thoroughly reinforced with overlaid bricks.  According to History of Ming, the reconstructed Ming-era wall was 2.5 zhàng tall, more than 1 zhàng wide at the top, and 9 li and 30 bu (about ) long.  It has two layers of moats dug outside, each being 3 zhàng wide and 8 chi deep, fed with water from the Little Shen River (the present day South Canal).  There were four city gates, each at the center of one side, connected by two main roads that intersected at Central Temple of the city's center in a "+" fashion.

This Ming wall was heavily damaged in 1625 when the Manchus laid siege and captured the city, with only the north wall and gate tower (which had undergone reinforcing reconstructions in 1545 under the orders of Jiajing Emperor) remained intact.  The Manchu leader Nurhachi however saw the city's strategic value and decided to formally relocate his Later Jin capital from Liaoyang to Shenyang, and ordered the wall to be rebuilt.  According to Annals of Mukden, the new city wall was a standard black brick wall standing at a height of 3.5 zhàng (about ), a width of 1.8 zhàng (about ) and a total length of 9 li and 332 bu (about ), complete with 12 towers (8 gates and 4 corners) and a widened 14.5-zhàng (about ) moat.  The city gates were increased from four to eight, though the old Ming-era north gate tower was preserved but sealed shut, later known as the "Ninth Gate".

The outer city wall, called the "peripheral wall" or "pass wall", was actually a rammed earth rampart built in 1680 to expand the urban area outside the inner city.  It was almost round in shape, standing at a height of 7.5 chi (around ) and an overall length of 32 li and 24 bu (about ), and also had eight towerless gates known as the "peripheral gates".  The corresponding inner and outer gates were linked by roads that intersected within the inner city in a "#" pattern around the Mukden Palace.

Nearly all of these city walls and gates were demolished after 1949.  Two gates and one corner tower of the inner wall were rebuilt during the 1990s.  There had, however, been proposals to rebuild the other gates and towers in preparation to the 12th National Games in 2013.

Around  outside Shenyang's former outer wall, there were four pagodas each located within an associated Tibetan Buddhist temple, namely the East Pagoda in Yongguang Temple, the South Pagoda in Guangci Temple, the West Pagoda in Yanshou Temple and the North Pagoda in Falun Temple. They were built in 1643 and completed in 1645. Nowadays only the temple for the North Pagoda is well preserved, the East and South has only the pagodas left, and the temple for the West Pagoda was rebuilt in 1998.

Both the Temple of Heaven and Temple of Earth were also to be found in the old city during the Qing dynasty.  They were smaller replicas of Beijing's counterparts. Neither exists today.

Geography

Shenyang ranges in latitude from 41° 11' to 43° 02' N and in longitude from 122° 25' to 123° 48' E, and is located in the central part of Liaoning province. The western parts of the city's administrative area are located on the alluvial plain of the Liao River system, while the eastern part consists of the hinterlands of the Changbai Mountains, and is covered with forests.

The city's main urban area is located to the north of Hun River, formerly the largest tributary of the Liao River proper and often locally referred as the city's "mother river".  The central urban area is surrounded by three artificial rivers — respectively the South Canal from the south and southeast, the Xinkai River (formerly the North Canal) from the north and northeast, and the Weigong River (formerly the Weigong Nullah) from the west, all interconnected by channels as a continuous waterway.  The South Canal in particular, famous for the series of linear parks and gardens along it, was canalized from the old course of the Wanquan River, historically also called the Little Shen River or Wuli River, which was a principal water source for the old city.   These are reinforced on the peripheries by smaller rivers such as Xi River, Puhe River and Mantang River, and drains into the Hun River at three different locations on the southeast, due south and southwest side of the city.  There was also previously another canal on the east side called Huishan Nullah that drains into Xinkai River's lower section, but is now no longer existent due to land reclamation from urban constructions.

Environment
It comprises 6 large parks and 18 riverside gardens, with exotic variety of vegetations such as rose, apricot, bladder cherry, honeylocust, natal lily, scarlet sage, morning glory and black-eyed-Susan, and extensive greenspaces of peach, pear, crabapples, ginkgos, weeping willows, pines and black locusts. It is the largest stretch of vegetated urban open space in Shenyang, contributing significantly to the city's current 40 percent "greening ratio", and was instrumental in the city being awarded the "national forest city" title in 2005.

According to the Shenyang Environmental Protection Bureau, winter usage of coal by boiler stations for hydronic district heating is the source of 30 percent of the air pollution in Shenyang.  Half of the 16 million metric tons of coal consumed by the city during the winter of 2013–2014 were used for heating.  Other major factors include dust from construction sites (20 percent), vehicle exhaust (20 percent), industrial emissions (10 percent) and extraterritorial dust (20 percent, mostly yellow dust from Gobi Desert).  However, air quality was described by the Bureau as "slowly improving".

Climate

Shenyang has a monsoon-influenced humid continental climate (Köppen Dwa) characterised by hot, humid summers due to the monsoon, and dry, cold winters due to the Siberian anticyclone. The four seasons here are distinctive. Nearly half of the annual rainfall occurs in July and August. The frost-free period is 183 days, which is long considering the severity of the winters. The city receives 2,468 hours of bright sunshine annually; monthly percent of possible ranges from 45 percent in July to 62 percent in October.

Administrative divisions

Shenyang's metropolitan area traditionally consisted of the 5 small inner urban districts, surrounded by 4 larger outer suburban districts, and accompanied by 4 rural counties on the north and west sides.  In general, agriculture, animal husbandry and agricultural product processing dominate northeastern Shenyang; eastern Shenyang is an automotive parts hub; southern Shenyang is a high-tech industrial base; and western Shenyang is home to heavy machinery manufacturing.  The city center specialises in retail and financial services.

Out of the rural counties, the Xinmin County was upgraded to a county-level city in 1993, and the Liaozhong County was incorporated into a new suburban district in 2016 as part of the provincial/national development plan.

As a result, Shenyang now officially has direct jurisdiction over 10 city districts, 1 satellite city and 2 rural counties:

Districts

Shenhe District

The Shenhe District is a part of the downtown and was also the most developed district in Shenyang. Until 2015, it held the seat of the City Government. The old city wall is entirely located in Shenhe District. There is the Central Temple, built during the Ming dynasty, showing the center of ancient Shenyang. This temple is located just south of the Middle Street, one of the most famous shopping streets and the first commercial pedestrian zone in China. Shenhe District is also home to the famous Wu'ai Market, the largest light industry wholesale trading center in the entire Bohai Economic Rim.

Shenhe District is the site of the Mukden Palace, just south of the Central Temple.  It is also the site of Zhang Zuolin's former home and headquarters, Shengjing Ancient Cultural Street.  In the western Shenhe District there is a Muslim town, and the South Pagoda is located in southern Shenhe District.  There are a lot of high-end hotels located in Shenhe District, such as Sheraton, Kempinski, Lexington, Marriott (which is the first Marriott Hotel directly named "Marriott" in mainland China, but due to finance conflicts is not administrated by Marriott International).  The major thoroughfare of Youths Avenue, the city's primary north–south arterial road that traverses past the City Government Square at the modern center of the city linking Beiling Park to the Taoxian Airport, separates the southern portion of Shenhe District from the neighbouring southern Heping District.  The iconic  Liaoning Broadcast and TV Tower is situated alongside this avenue.

Shenhe District is also home to Northeast China's main railway hub, the Shenyang North Railway Station (locally known as the "North Station").  The railways leading to the station forms the border between Shenhe District and the neighbouring eastern portion of Huanggu District.  The station building has recently  undergone a major overhaul and extension.

Heping District

The Heping District is located in the downtown of Shenyang, bordered Shenhe District. It is currently the most developed district in Shenyang. Heping District has all manner of commercial businesses that are brightly neon-lit at night, centered around Taiyuan Street, one of the most famous shopping district in the Northeast. The Project 985 university, Northestern University, is also located in Heping District.

The district, better known as the downtown, sprung up around Shenyang Railway Station (known locally as the "South Station" in contrast to the "North Station" in Shenhe District), the former hub of the South Manchurian Railway.  At the center of the district is Zhongshan Square, which features one of China's largest statues of Chairman Mao—a record of the era of the Cultural Revolution.  Northwest of Zhongshan Square lies the West Pagoda Korean Neighborhood or Koreatown.  Many of the boulevards in this area are lined of very large ginkgo trees, which become golden in color and produce their distinctive fruits in autumn.

Heping District is also the core area for many political institutions in the Northeast, including CPC Liaoning Provincial Committee, headquarters of the Northern Theater Command (previously the Shenyang Military Region), General Logistics Department and the consulates-general of the United States, Japan. South Korea, [North Korea and other countries.  Northeast Electricity, China Post, railways, other such industrial hubs and many media outlets such as Liaoning Radio and Television, Shenyang Radio and Television and Shenyang Daily newspaper are also located in this district.

Dadong District
The Dadong District is an industrial zone and used to be the largest of the inner city districts. Its name derives from the fact that the district started off as the residential area immediately outside the old inner city wall's Fujin Gate, which is also called Great East Gate.

The district contains popular tourist landmarks such as the 9.18 Historical Museum, the North and East Pagodas, Bawang Temple and the Wanquan Park.  The oldest airfield in Shenyang, the now-defunct East Pagoda Airport, is also located in Dadong District.

Huanggu District

The Huanggu District is named after Huanggutun ("tun" means village), where the Huanggutun Incident took place. The name is actually a mis-tranliteration of the pronunciation for Fiyanggū (1605–1643), the Manchu Prince Jian of the First Rank whose tomb was in the area.

The district is the site of Beiling park, the large historical mausoleum of Qing dynasty emperor Huang Taiji, as well as the Liaoning Mansion Hotel. It also hosts the seat of the Provincial Government of Liaoning.

Tiexi District
The Tiexi District is the most populous district and makes up the western part of the inner city, west of the South Manchurian Railway (hence the district's name) and south of the Jingshen Railway, and is famous for its heavy industry. This mixed-use district also contains large blocks of residential complexes, so as well as strips of small to medium-sized shopping districts. In May 2002, the Shenyang city government annexed a large area of suburban land from the neighbouring Yuhong District to establish a new state-level development zone—the Shenyang Economic and Technological Development Zone, and transferred its administration to Tiexi District to form the Tiexi New District, thus giving Tiexi District the current "necked" shape on the map.

The district is featured in a 9-hour epic documentary film West of the Tracks by a young filmmaker Wang Bing. It shows the transition in this rust belt district—a palimpsest of not only Chinese but also world history. The first factories of this place were built in 1934 by the Japanese to produce war goods for the Imperial Army and nationalized after World War II.  As late as the early 1980s, the factories here employed about one million workers, but all of them went jobless in the 1990s.

Hunnan District

The Hunnan District, was formerly called the Dongling District before June 17, 2014, referring to the UNESCO World Heritage Site-listed tombs dedicated to Nurhachi, the founder of Later Jin, and his empress Monggo-Jerjer. The large suburban district is located on the east and southeast side of urban Shenyang, with most of its territory south of the Hun River, hence its current name. The Shenyang municipal government moved to Hunnan District on 13 October 2015. The Shenyang Botanical Garden and the Shenyang International Expo Garden (which hosted the 2006 International Horticultural Exposition) are also located in this district.

Hunnan District hosts the city's only operational commercial airport, the Taoxian International Airport, and is rapidly becoming high-end residential areas with luxury apartments, fine neighbourhoods and commercial developments, as hunnan becomes the new center of Shenyang steadily with the new government being developed there.  The district is traversed by two corridors along two major highways, one leading to the Eastern Mausoleum and the neighbouring city of Fushun, and the other leading to the airport.

Launched in 1988 as the Shenyang National New and High-Tech Industrial Development Zone and elevated to a national-level zone in 1991, the Hunnan New Area focuses on electronic and information technology products such as software, computers, network systems, communication equipment and audio/visual equipment; advanced manufacturing technologies, especially for automobiles, medical equipment; advanced materials and biological and pharmaceutical products. The zone has hosted more than 5,700 enterprises, including 700 foreign-invested enterprises.  Foreign companies such as the General Electric Co., Tyco International, and Mitsubishi Group operate in the zone.

Sujiatun District
Sujiatun is known mostly for its agricultural and industrial activity. It borders the districts of Yuhong and Heping to the north, Dongling to the northeast, Tiexi to the northwest; it also borders the prefecture-level cities of Fushun to the east, Benxi to the southeast, and Liaoyang to the southwest.

Shenbei New District
The Shenbei New District, formerly Xinchengzi District, is a new development zone and forms the majority of the northern suburbs. It borders Hunnan District to the southeast, Dadong and Huanggu Districts to the south, Yuhong District to the southwest, Xinmin City and Faku County to the northwest; it also borders the prefecture-level cities of Tieling to the northeast and Fushun to the southeast.

Yuhong District
The Yuhong District forms part of the northwestern and western suburbs. It borders Shenbei New District to the northeast, Huanggu District to the east, Tiexi District to the south, and Xinmin City to the west. China Resources Beverage, the distributor of C'estbon Water, has its Northeast regional office in the district.

The large southwestern part of the neighbouring Tiexi District also used to belong to Yuhong District, but in May 2002, the southwestern part of Yuhong District was ceded on order of the city government to establish the Shenyang Economic and Technological Development Zone, and the administration of the region was later transferred to Tiexi District instead.  This annexation of land left an exclave territory lying between Tiexi District, Heping District and Sujiatun District, separated from the main body of Yuhong District, hence making the Tiexi District flanked at the "neck" by the two parts of Yuhong.

Liaozhong District
The Liaozhong District (referring to its central location within the province) is the newest and largest suburban district. Formerly the Liaozhong County,  its rural county status was made defunct in January 2016, and formally instated as a suburban city district on April 11, 2016. It is the most southwestern part of Shenyang City, bordering Xinmin City to the north, and Tiexi District to the northeast, as well as the prefecture-level cities of Liaoyang to the southeast, Anshan to the south and southwest, and Jinzhou to the west.

Satellite city

Xinmin City

It borders Faku County to the northeast, Shenbei and Yuhong Districts to the east, Tiexi District to the southeast, Liaozhong District to the south, the prefecture-level cities of Jinzhou to the west and Fuxin to the northwest.

Xinmin has one of the leading horticulture industries in China, especially in apples, watermelon and white cabbages, as well as animal husbandry such as chicken and pigs.  Light manufacturing is also an important part of Xinmin's economy, with 57% of its GDP derived from food processing, pharmaceuticals and packaging products in 2012.  The city also has access to the Liaohe oil field.  There are also proposals to relocated the defunct East Pagoda Airport to Xinmin for reopening.

Rural counties

Faku County

The county's name is reportedly a phonetic transliteration of the Manchu word for fishing weir, due to the county's fishing resources from its extensive network of rivers, lakes and reservoirs. The county borders the Kangping County to the north, Shenbei New District to the southeast, Xinmin City to the southwest, and the prefecture-level cities of Tieling to the east, and Fuxin to the west. Other than agriculture, Faku County has the richest source of minerals in the Shenyang area, including the largest reserve of kaolinite and wollastonite in China. As a result, in recent years the county has attracted a lot of foreign investment from the ceramic industry.

Kangping County
It was historically first established in 1880 under the blessing of the Guangxu Emperor, hence the name. The county borders the Faku County to the south, the  prefecture-level cities of Tieling to the east, Fuxin to the southwest and Inner Mongolia's Tongliao to the north. The county is mostly agricultural, with majority of its GDP coming from crop and fruit planting. However, in recent years the synthetic fabric, carbon fiber and alternative energy industries begin to take hold in Kangping. The county currently has the third largest wind farm in the whole province.

Demographics

Shenyang has a population of 8.1 million and its urban population is 5.74 million.
Ethnically and culturally diverse, Shenyang has 38 of China's 56 recognized ethnic groups, including the Han Chinese majority that make up 91.26 percent of Shenyang's population. The 37 minority groups are Manchu, Korean, Hui, Xibo, Mongolian, Zhuang, Miao, Tujia, Dong, Daur, Bai,  Uyghur, Tibetan, Yi, Taiwanese Aboriginal People, She, Bouyei, Yao, Akha, Kazakh, Dai, Li, Shui, Nakhi, Jingpo, Kyrgyz, Tu, Mulao, Qiang, Maonan, Gelao, Russian, Evenks, Tatars, Oroqen, Nanai and Lhoba. Most of these groups are not native to the Shenyang area; a few, such as the Manchus and the Xibe, are.

Shenyang has numerous temples, mosques, churches and other religious places of worship.

Economy

Shenyang is an important industrial center in China and is the core city of the Shenyang Economic Zone, a New Special Reform Zone. It has been focused on heavy industry, particularly aerospace, machine tools, heavy equipment and defence, and recently on software, automotive and electronics. The heavy industry started in the 1920s and was well developed before the second world war. During the first five-year plan (1951–1956) many factories were built in Tiexi district. At its peak in the 1970s, Shenyang was one of the top three industrial centers in China alongside Shanghai and Tianjin, and was at one time being considered for upgrading to a direct-controlled municipality.  However, as the planned economy fell out of favor after the 1980s, the heavy industry had declined gradually and the city became a rust belt city, with hundreds of thousands of people laid off from bankrupted state-owned factories. Nonetheless, the economy of the city has revived significantly in recent years, thanks to the central government's "Revitalize Northeast China" campaign and the rapid development of software and auto manufacture industries. Investment subsidies are granted to multinational corporations (MNCs) that set up offices or headquarters in Shenyang.

The services sector—especially banking—has been developing in Shenyang. Shenyang has several foreign banks, such as South Korea's Hana Bank, Japan's Bank of Tokyo-Mitsubishi UFJ, Hong Kong's Bank of East Asia, Singapore's United Overseas Bank and the Britain-based HSBC.  In 2006, the city hosted a total of 1,063 banks and bank branches and 144 insurance-related companies. By 2010, it aims to attract 30 foreign banks and 60 non-bank financial institutions.

The city has been identified by the Economist Intelligence Unit in the November 2010 Access China White Paper as a member of the CHAMPS (Chongqing, Hefei, Anshan, Maanshan, Pingdingshan and Shenyang), an economic profile of the top 20 emerging cities in China.

Shenyang has three development zones:
Shenyang Finance and Trade Development Zone
Shenyang High-Tech Industrial Development Zone
Shenyang Economic & Technological Development Zone

Numerous major industrial companies have their headquarters in Shenyang.  Brilliance Auto is a major Chinese automobile manufacturer, and most of its production plants are also located in Shenyang.  Shenyang Aircraft Corporation produces airplanes for civilian use as well as for the PLAAF.  Neusoft Group is the biggest software company in China.  Shenyang Machine Tool Group is the largest machine tool manufacturer in China.  Tyco International, General Motors and Michelin Shenyang Tyre Corporation are expanding their operations in Shenyang.

The GDP per capita of the city of Shenyang is 78,490 yuan in 2009 (ranked 3rd out of all 58 cities and counties in Liaoning province).

Transportation
As the transport hub of Northeast China, Shenyang is served by air, rail, a currently two-line subway system and an extensive network of streets and expressways, with bus service throughout the city. Terminal 3 at Shenyang Taoxian International Airport is the largest terminal in the northeast China. A new tram network system was built in the city's south in 2013.

Rail

Shenyang is the railway hub of Northeast China. Eight railways connect Shenyang with Beijing, Dalian, Changchun, Harbin and Fushun. The city is also served by the Qinhuangdao–Shenyang high-speed railway, the main passenger transport corridor in and out across the Shanhai Pass, and the first passenger-specific railway line in China.

Shenyang has two major railway stations: the Shenyang North railway station in Shenhe District, and the Shenyang railway station in Heping District.

The Shenyang North Railway Station was formerly the Liaoning General Station before 1946, and colloquially known as the "Old North Station". The Main Station Building of the current "New North Station" began construction in 1986 and was commissioned for operation in December 1990, and became one of the five most important railway hubs in China, earning itself the nickname "Northeast's No. 1 Station". In 2011, a huge expansion project known as the "North Station Transport Hub Reconstruction Project" was initiated in response to the growing demand of floor area posed by the increasing passenger traffic after introduction of the high-speed rail service. The station now has an additional 3-storey "Sub-Station Building" and a "North Square" on the northern (Huanggu District) side of the railways, while the old waiting lounge in the original 16-storey Main Station Building is now relocated to a large elevated concourse that bridges over the rail tracks, with a pillar-less roof (the largest in mainland China) doming the platforms. The original South Square outside the Main Station Building was rebuilt into a multi-levelled complex, with two above ground forming an elevated airport-style drop-off zone and a large ground-level area for bus stops, as well as a three-level underground city providing shopping malls, parking lots, taxi pick-up and interchange with Subway Line 2, while also capable of rapid conversion into an air raid shelter if needed.

The Shenyang Railway Station has a history of more than 100 years.  It was built by the Russians in 1899 on the eastern side of the South Manchurian Railway and was named the Fengtian Station at the time.  It was later expanded by the Japanese after the Russo-Japanese War and renamed to Fengtian Yam until the end of the World War II.  Before adopting its current name, the station was known as the Shenyang South Railway Station or simply the "South Station" (in contrast to the forementioned "North Station") between 1945 and 1950, a name the locals still use colloquially to present days (though the current Shenyang South railway station is actually at the suburban junction between Hunnan and Sujiatun).  Today, the station focuses on regular-speed passenger service and is being refurbished with a large archway and new terminal, reducing access to the boarding platforms by rerouting customers under and over ground while construction is completed.  The station was expanded in 2010 with the addition of a new West Station Building and a West Square on the western side of the railways.  The old East Station Building is currently on the provincial protected heritage list.

Since 2011, a daily direct container rail service has carried automotive parts  from Leipzig, Germany to Shenyang through Siberia with a  23-day transit time.

Road

In the Manchukuo era, the initial road transportation network was laid out, as is now in the central districts of Shenyang.  The city follows a largely grid-style urban layout, with the roads follow a slightly tilted northwest-to-southeast orientation due to the South Manchurian Railway, which runs perpendicular to that direction.  The streets in Shenyang are almost always named according to a routine convention — one that runs more in the north–south direction is called a "street" or "avenue", and one that runs more east–west are call a "road" or "boulevard".  The only exceptions to this rule are the east–west Middle Street in Shenhe District, which takes its historical name from ancient times (though its modern official name is actually the "Middle Street Road"); and the north–south Minzhu Road in Heping District that traverses diagonally across the superblock between the Shenyang Railway Station and the Zhongshan Park, but as one of the only three diagonal streets in the entire city it is accommodated as a "road" instead of "street" in keeping with the other two diagonal counterparts that run east–west.

In addition to the grid streets, Shenyang also was developing several ring road systems, going back as early as the "Fengtian City Plan" proposed by the Japanese-controlled puppet Manchukuo government in 1932.  Outside of the (now demolished) city walls, the city initially planned three beltways, namely the "inner ring", "middle ring" and "outer ring" roads.  Gradually with urban development, the inner ring idea faded away into the inner city grids, but the middle ring concept was retained and later transformed into the nowadays 1st Ring Road (officially called the "Middle Ring Road" until 1995), and the outer ring morphed roughly into parts of the present day 2nd Ring Road.  The 3rd Ring Road was completed in 1995, and in 2013 was upgraded into an 8-lane,  freeway—the G1501 Shenyang Ring Expressway.  The 10-lane,  4th Ring Road is a limited-access highway about  out from the 3rd Ring, completed in 2013.  The planned 6-lane,  5th Ring Road and the proposed  6th Ring Road, also known as the G91 Liaozhong Ring Expressway, are both currently under construction.

Shenyang is connected to the other regions by several major expressways in radial pattern. The  Shendan Expressway to the southeast, part of the G1113 Dandong–Fuxin Expressway that traverses Shenyang from the northwest, is a 4-lane expressway leading to Benxi and Dandong, and also serves Shenyang Taoxian International Airport. The 4-lane G1212 Shenji Expressway to the east was completed in 2011, linking Shenyang to Jilin via Fushun. There are other smaller provincial-level expressways ("S routes") to other cities like Fushun, Liaoyang and Panjin, as well as many long-distance and express bus routes to Beijing and other large Northeastern regional centers via major national roads such as the China National Highways 101, 102, 203 and 304.

Airport

The city is served by the Shenyang Taoxian International Airport, located in Hunnan District.  It is one of the eight major airline hubs and the 20th busiest airport in China.

There are three other airports in Shenyang, none of them open to public.  The East Pagoda Airport in Dadong District is the oldest airport in Shenyang, opened in 1920s and retired in the 1980s, though there has been proposals in 2013 to relocate and reopen it in Xinmin.  The Beiling Airport in Huanggu District is used by Shenyang Aircraft Corporation for test flights.  The Yuhong Airport in Yuhong District is commissioned for military use only by the local Northern Theater Command garrisons.

Public transport

In Shenyang, there are more than 160 bus routes.  Shenyang used to have about 20 trolley bus routes, one of the biggest trolley bus networks in China. The entire network was demolished in 1999 after a serious electrocution accident that killed 5 passengers on August 12, 1998, and was replaced by gas and diesel-powered buses.

Trams in Shenyang was introduced in Shenyang from 1924, and had 6 lines in operation up until 1945. It suffered major disruptions during the Chinese Civil War from power outage and Kuomintang bombings, but quickly resumed operation after the conclusion of the Liaoshen Campaign.  After the establishment of the People's Republic of China, the tram network was gradually replaced by the buses and trolley buses, and eventually closed in 1974. In December 2011, the Shenyang city government announced plan to rebuild light rail transit network in 2012, comprising 4 lines with  distance in the Hunnan New District. The Shenyang Modern Tram network started operation on August 15, 2013.

Shenyang has been planning an underground rapid transit system since 1940, but was unable to materialize the idea due to the city's geology and engineering limitations.  On November 18, 2005, the construction of the first Shenyang Metro line finally started and the construction of the second line started on November 18, 2006. The first (east–west) line was opened September 27, 2010, and the second (north–south) was opened on January 9, 2012.  Construction is difficult due to the granite-rich bedrock on which the city is built.

Healthcare 
Shenyang has 731 medical and healthcare centers, 63,000 healthcare staff and 3.02 healthcare worker per 1,000 people. There are 34,033 hospital beds and 45,680 various kinds of medical and technical personnel, among whom there are 17,346 licensed doctors, 1,909 assistant licensed doctors, and 16887 certified nurses. The average expected life-span of the people in Shenyang is 73.8 years.

The China Medical University in Huanggu District is one of the top 10 medical schools in China and is IMED-listed.  Its diplomas are accredited worldwide.

Shenyang is home to China Medical University Hospital, China Medical University 1st, 2nd (renamed Shengjing Hospital in 2003) and 4th Affiliated Hospital, 202 Hospital, Liaoning Tumor Hospital, Shenyang No.7 People's Hospital, Shenyang Orthopaedics Hospital, Shenyang Army General Hospital, North Hospital, and various other hospitals and clinics.

Military
Shenyang hosts the headquarters of the People's Liberation Army's Northern Theater Command (formerly the Shenyang Military Region) and garrisons its air force divisions.

Shenyang is also famous for its defense industries, with the Shenyang Aircraft Corporation (SAC), nicknamed "the cradle of Chinese jetfighters"", being the People's Republic's oldest and largest aircraft manufacturer, responsible for the design and manufacturing of the currently operational J-8, J-11, J-15, J-16 fighter aircraft and the in-development J-31 stealth aircraft.  The Shenyang Aeroengine Research Institute, a subdivision of SAC, is also responsible for designing the indigenous WS-10, WS-15 and WS-20 turbofan engines.

In 2014, South Korea and China agreed to repatriate the remains of 400 People's Volunteer Army soldiers killed during the Korean War, which had been buried in Paju, and scheduled to be reburied in a state military cemetery in Shenyang.

Culture

Shenyang dialect
People native to Shenyang speak the Shenyang dialect, a variant of Northeastern Mandarin. Shenyang Dialect was formed in early period of Qing Dynasty. Shenyang dialect is similar to the other Northeastern dialects and also to the national standard of Mandarin, Putonghua, but is known as a form of Dongbeihua and has a wide range of vocabulary that is not part of the country's official language. As Shenyang dialect is mutually intelligible with most forms of Mandarin, some people prefer to characterize it as an "accent" rather than a different "dialect".

Art
Two northeast folk dances, Errenzhuan and Yangge, are very popular in Shenyang.  The Big Stage Theatre near Middle Street is famous for its Errenzhuan and Chinese comedy skit performances by Zhao Benshan and his disciples.  Due to the popularity enjoyed by many Shenyang-based comedians, the city is nationally recognized as a stronghold of Chinese comedy.

Shenyang is home of many performance art organizations, such as Shenyang Acrobatic Troupe of China, Liaoning Song and Dance Ensemble, and Liaoning Ballet.  Many artists are from Shenyang, such as Zimei, Na Ying and the pianist Lang Lang.

Museums

Liaoning Provincial Museum, the largest museum in Northeast China. The museum hold many ancient relics and artefacts, including a selection of inscriptions in Chinese and Khitan that are some of the earliest known forms of writing.
Shenyang Steam Locomotive Museum, with 16 steam engines from America, Japan, Russia, Belgium, Poland, Germany, Czechoslovakia and China.
9.18 Historical Museum, a museum in memory of Mukden Incident on September 18, 1931.  The museum has a shape of an opened calendar, and is located on the site where the Japanese troops destroyed the South Manchuria Railway, the prelude to the invasion of Manchuria.
Xinle Relic, located on the location where the Xinle civilisation was first discovered, containing a reconstructed Xinle settlement and housing artefacts discovered there.

Sports
Shenyang is famous for its football tradition.  The local football club is the Liaoning F.C., in the Chinese League One.  Liaoning F.C. was once the consecutive national champion for 10 years from 1984 to 1993, and the first Chinese team to win the AFC Champions League in 1990. Another Chinese Super League team, Shenyang Jinde moved to Changsha in 2007. Shenyang Olympic Sports Center Stadium, a 60,000-seated soccer stadium, was a venue for the football preliminary of 2008 Summer Olympics.

Shenyang also has one of the five full-length (400 m) speed skating rink in China, the Bayi Speed Skating Arena.

Religion
The Shenyang city government legally recognizes five religious beliefs—Buddhism, Taoism, Islam, Catholicism and Protestantism.  During the period between 1949 and 1976, religious practices were significantly repressed, but have recovered since the end of the Cultural Revolution.  , Shenyang has seven city-level religious organizations, with 289 legally registered places of worship, 483 clerics and about 400,000 followers.

Famous religious sites include:

Buddhism
Chang'an Temple, a Zen Buddhism temple, first built during the Tang dynasty
Bore Temple, built during the Qing dynasty
Ci'en Temple, a Pure Land Buddhism temple,
Wugoujingguang Śarīra Pagoda, a 33-m-high Buddhist pagoda erected in 1044 during the Liao dynasty
Shisheng Temple, once known as Imperial Temple, a Tibetan Buddhist temple built in 1636 for the Qing royal family
The East Pagoda, North Pagoda, West Pagoda and South Pagoda, collectively known as the "Four Pagodas of Early Qing" are four white Tibetan Buddhist pagodas built by Hong Taiji in 1639.

Taoism
Taiqing Palace, built in 1663
Pengying Palace, the only female Taoist temple in Northeast China, built in 1994
Doumu Palace, formerly the second largest Taoist temple in Shenyang

Christianity
Sacred Heart Cathedral of Shenyang, a Roman Catholic cathedral
Dongguan Church, one of the largest and oldest Protestant churches in Northeast China, also known as the cradle of Christianity of the Koreans in China and in the Korean Peninsula
Xita Church, a Protestant church for the Korean Chinese

Islam
South Mosque, the largest mosque in Northeast China, built in Qing dynasty

Cuisine
Shenyang has classic northeastern Chinese cuisine.  Traditional meals in the region are suan cai (also called Chinese sauerkraut), stewed chicken and mushroom, and meat pie.  Korean food, such as rice cake and cold noodle, is a part of Shenyangers' diet as there is a sizeable ethnic Korean population in the city. Also, as the area was traditionally occupied by Manchus, the cuisine in Shenyang was fundamentally influenced by Manchu food, as well as the famous Manchu Han Imperial Feast.

Due to the sizeable Hui population in Shenyang, halal foods are a common and also enjoyed by non-Muslim people.

Notable people
Dr. Min Chiu Li, therapeutic scientist, Albert Lasker Medical Research Award winner, Alfred Sloan Award in Cancer Research winner
Zhang Zuolin, Chinese/Manchurian politician
Guo Songling, Chinese/Manchurian general working with Zhang Xueliang
Tetsuzo Fuyushiba, Japanese/Manchurian politician
Fan Wei, sketch comedian and film actor
Gong Li, Singaporean/Chinese actress
Silence Wang, Chinese singer and songwriter
Wu Xin, Chinese actress and host
Na Ying, Chinese singer
Lang Lang, Chinese pianist
Ai Jing, Chinese singer and painter
Jing Boran, Chinese actor and singer
Zheng Shuang, Chinese actress (known for her role in Meteor Shower and Love O2O)
Zhang Xiyuan Chinese actress (known for her role in Love Just Come)
Wang Qianyuan, Chinese actor
Qin Hao, Chinese actor
Chen Xingxu, Chinese actor
Yu Bo, Chinese actor
Zhao Jinmai, Chinese actress
Jian Renzi, Chinese actress
Yan Zidong, Chinese actor
Mao Ning, Chinese actor and singer
Wang Bowen, Chinese actor and singer
Jin Qiaoqiao, Chinese actress and producer
Li Zimeng, Chinese television presenter
Zimei, Chinese artist and Guzheng player
Kōbō Abe, Japanese novelist, brought up in Shenyang (Mukden)
Seiji Ozawa, Japanese conductor, born in Shenyang (Mukden)
Ma Lin, table-tennis player
Zhu Xuejun, missile scientist and chief designer of the DF-17
Wang Yongzhi, aerospace engineer and academic
Jin Xing, dancer and actor
Liu Dongsheng,  geological and environmental engineer
Chang Hsin-kang, professor, the former President of City University of Hong Kong
Lin Gengxin, actor known for his role in Scarlet Heart
Yoshiko Yamaguchi, stage name Li Xianglan, actress, peace-activist
Xu Geyang, singer
Du Haitao, Comedian and actor
Qin Lan, Chinese actress and singer
Luo Yang, photographer

Tourism

Attractions
Mukden Palace: the former imperial palace of the early Qing dynasty.  It is a UNESCO World Heritage Site.
East Mausoleum: the tomb of the first Qing emperor, Nurhaci.  It is a UNESCO World Heritage Site.
Beiling Park and North Mausoleum: the tomb of the second Qing emperor, Huang Taiji. It is a UNESCO World Heritage Site.
Qipan Mountain: a recreation resort in Shenbei New District, northeast of Shenyang.
Strange Slope: an -long, -wide slope on the western side of Mao Mountain in Shenbei District, famous for the unexplained phenomenon of vehicles seemingly able to move uphill unpowered.
Shenyang Botanical Garden  is located within the Qipanshan Tourism District. Since then it has also been known as the Shenyang International Expo Garden. A variety of botanical exhibitions are held throughout the year.
Meteorite Mountain Forest Park, located in the southeast of Shenyang in Hunnan District. It is the oldest meteorite in the world which was formed 4.5 billion years ago and fallen into the Earth 1.9 billion years ago.
Xiaonan Cathedral of Shenyang, the construction of the cathedral started in 1875 and finished in 1878.
Qipanshan Tourism Development Zone

Shopping areas

Shenyang has many shopping areas that provide necessities, luxuries and entertainments. One of the shopping districts is Middle Street. Middle Street has a history of more than 100 years. In 2005, Middle Street gained the title of China top 10 famous commercial shopping streets and in 2008; it won the International Golden Street title. Middle Street is also the first commercial pedestrian street in China.  Middle Street features many western-style stores and restaurants, including Wal-Mart, Pizza Hut, Louis Vuitton flagship store, Häagen-Dazs retail store, etc. The largest shopping mall in Shenyang is also located on Middle Street, selling products from all around the world.

Taiyuan Street is another shopping area which is similar to Middle Street. Taiyuan Street many restaurants and theaters for people to enjoy. Many spend their holidays shopping on these two streets. There is also a very large underground shopping center, offering many items, especially fashion jewelries, accessories and clothing.

Another area, Wu'ai Market, features a large multi-story shopping center with a size comparable to that of many city blocks. It is famous for wholesaling cheap clothes and household items.

The information technology center is in Sanhao street in the southern part of the city. There are large superstores located throughout the city that sell everything from meat and dairy to clothes and electronics.

Research and education
Shenyang has one of the highest concentrations of educational institutes in China. Roughly 30 colleges and universities and numerous research and training institutions are located in Shenyang, including core institutes of the Chinese Academy of Sciences.

Research institutes
Institute of Metal Research, Chinese Academy of Sciences
Shenyang Institute of Automation, Chinese Academy of Sciences
Shenyang Institute of Applied Ecology, Chinese Academy of Sciences, formerly the Institute of Forestry and Pedology
Shenyang Institute of Computing Technology, Chinese Academy of Sciences
Shenyang Aircraft Design Institute, also known as the "601 Institute"
Shenyang Aeroengine Research Institute, also known as the "606 Institute"

High schools

Liaoning Province Shiyan High School
Shenyang No. 1 High School (沈阳市第一中学)
Shenyang No. 2 High School
Shenyang No. 4 High School
Shenyang No. 5 High School
Shenyang No. 20 High School
Shenyang No. 31 High School
Shenyang No.120 High School
Northeast Yucai School

International schools
Shenyang Transformation International School, founded in 1998 by the International Schools of China (ISC), a United States non-profit organization committed to educational work in China.
Shenyang Pacific International Academy, located in Shenbei District. The school offers an American-style high school education.
Canadian International School Shenyang, located in Shenbei District, founded in 2017 with joint co-operation of AKD International Education and the Canadian government. The school offers a Canadian-style education ranging from kindergarten to middle school.
QSI International School of Shenyang (QSI), founded in 2012 and located at Sekisui House, Hunnan New District

Universities
China Medical University
Liaoning University
Liaoning Communication University:zh:辽宁传媒学院
Liaoning University of Traditional Chinese Medicine
Lu Xun Academy of Fine Arts
Northeastern University
Shenyang Jianzhu University
Shenyang University
Shenyang City University 
Shenyang Aerospace University
Shenyang Agricultural University
Shenyang Conservatory of Music
Shenyang Institute of Engineering
Shenyang Ligong University
Shenyang Medical College
Shenyang Normal University
Shenyang Pharmaceutical University
Shenyang Sport University 
Shenyang University of Chemical Technology
Shenyang University of Technology

Defunct universities
Fengyong University was the first private university in China to follow western teaching methods.  It was established on August 8, 1927 with private funding by retired Fengtian clique major general Feng Yong (1901–1981, later re-enlisted as a ROCAF lieutenant general).  It contained the departments of Engineering, Law and Education.  After the Mukden Incident, the campus was looted by Japanese troops and converted into an aircraft repair camp.  The staffs and students were later forced to evacuate to Beiping, where the university continued teaching for two more years before merging with the National Northeastern University in September, 1933.  Many of the university's alumni were active members of anti-Japanese volunteer armies.

International relations

Foreign consulates
Japan, Russia, South Korea, France, Germany, North Korea, Australia and the United States all have consulates in Shenyang, located in Heping District.

Twin towns – Sister cities
Shenyang has established sister/friendship city relationships with many other cities around the world. These relationships have sought to promote economic, cultural, educational and other ties.

Sister cities

 Sapporo, Hokkaido, Japan 1980
 Kawasaki, Kanagawa, Japan 1981
 Turin, Italy 1985
 Chicago, United States 1985
 Irkutsk, Russia 1992
 Quezon City, Philippines 1993
 Ramat Gan, Israel 1993
 Gongju, South Chungcheong, South Korea 1996
 Chuncheon, Gangwon Province, South Korea 1998
 Seongnam, Gyeonggi, South Korea 1998
 Yaoundé, Cameroon 1998
 Ho Chi Minh City, Vietnam 1999
 Gumi, North Gyeongsang, South Korea 1999
 Thessaloniki, Greece 2000
 Ostrava, Czech Republic 2006
 Katowice, Poland 2007
 Hamamatsu, Shizuoka, Japan 2010
 Ufa, Bashkortostan, Russia 2011
 Novosibirsk, Russia 2013
 Incheon, South Korea 2014
 La Plata, Argentina 2014
 Belfast, Northern Ireland 2016

Friendship cities
 Pittsburg, California, United States
 Düsseldorf, Germany
 Marabá, Pará, Brazil

In media
The decline of Shenyang's Tiexi district in the 1990s was recorded by director Wang Bing in the film Tie Xi Qu: West of the Tracks.

See also

List of cities in the People's Republic of China by population
Unit 100
List of twin towns and sister cities in China
SYTV
List of universities and colleges in Shenyang

References

Citations

Sources 

Avila Tàpies, Rosalia (2012) Territorialidad y etnicidad en Manchuria: el ejemplo de la ciudad de Mukden (Shenyang) bajo la ocupación japonesa.  Biblio 3W. Revista Bibliográfica de Geografía y Ciencias Sociales. [En línea]. Barcelona: Universidad de Barcelona, 25 de enero de 2012, Vol. XVII, nº 959. <http://www.ub.es/geocrit/b3w-959.htm >. .
Hata, Ikuhiro. "Continental Expansion: 1905–1941". In The Cambridge History of Japan. Vol. 6. Cambridge University Press. 1988.
Menning, Bruce W. Bayonets before Battle: The Imperial Russian Army, 1861–1914. Indiana University. .

Shubert, John. A Biography of Yoshiko Yamaguchi. See www.yoshikoyamaguchi.blogspot.com

External links

Shenyang Government website 

 
Provincial capitals in China
Capitals of former nations
Cities in Liaoning
Prefecture-level divisions of Liaoning
National Forest Cities in China
Populated places established in the 1st millennium BC